The Westerly Burial Ground (also known as Westerly Burying Ground) is an historic cemetery on Centre Street in the West Roxbury neighborhood of Boston, Massachusetts. Established in 1683, it is Boston's seventh-oldest cemetery, and where the first settlers of the West Roxbury area are buried.  It was enlarged in 1832, and 1844, and its last documented burial was in 1962.  Eight American Revolutionary War veterans are buried there as well as fifteen veterans of the American Civil War.

The cemetery was added to the National Register of Historic Places in 1987.

See also
List of cemeteries in Boston, Massachusetts
National Register of Historic Places listings in southern Boston, Massachusetts

References
 Massachusetts Cultural Resource Information System Inventory No: BOS.816

Image gallery

Cemeteries in West Roxbury, Boston
Cemeteries on the National Register of Historic Places in Massachusetts
National Register of Historic Places in Boston
1683 establishments in Massachusetts